Donald Waynne Pretty (born June 11, 1936) is a Canadian rower who competed in the 1956 Summer Olympics and in the 1964 Summer Olympics.

In 1956 he was a crew member of the Canadian boat which won the silver medal in the eights event.

Eight years later he finished ninth with the Canadian boat in the eight competition.

References

External links
 profile

1936 births
Living people
Canadian male rowers
Olympic rowers of Canada
Rowers at the 1956 Summer Olympics
Rowers at the 1964 Summer Olympics
Olympic silver medalists for Canada
Olympic medalists in rowing
Medalists at the 1956 Summer Olympics
Commonwealth Games medallists in rowing
Commonwealth Games gold medallists for Canada
Rowers at the 1958 British Empire and Commonwealth Games
Medallists at the 1958 British Empire and Commonwealth Games